SH6 may refer to:

 State Highway 6 (New Zealand)
 Texas State Highway 6
 Minnesota State Highway 6

See also 
 List of highways numbered 6